01.  is a Japanese high school located in the Kamata area of Ōta, Tokyo.

02. Kamata High School (ମାଣିକେଶ୍ୱରୀ ନୋଡାଲ ଉଚ୍ଚ ବିଦ୍ୟାଳୟ,କାମତା) Or Govt (New) Manikeswari Nodal High School, Kamata is a Board of Secondary Education, Odisha High School Located at Kamata Village, Block - Borigumma, Dist - Koraput, Odisha, Pin 764057.

See also

References

External links
 Kamata High School (Japanese)
Manikeswari Nodal High School, Kamata Official Website (India)

Tokyo Metropolitan Government Board of Education schools
High schools in Tokyo
Ōta, Tokyo